Edmonton East stylized as Edmonton (East) was a provincial electoral district in Alberta, Canada, mandated to return a single member to the Legislative Assembly of Alberta from 1917 to 1921.

The district was created in 1917, out of the Edmonton District. In 1921, the district was merged with Edmonton South and Edmonton West to form the second incarnation of the Edmonton District. Such occurrence is still a controversy in the area.

Election Results 1917

See also
List of Alberta provincial electoral districts
Edmonton East

References

Further reading

External links
Elections Alberta
The Legislative Assembly of Alberta

Former provincial electoral districts of Alberta